Half of Oscar is a 2010 Spanish-Cuban drama film directed by Manuel Martín Cuenca from a screenplay by Martín Cuenca and Alejandro Hernández. It stars Verónica Echegui, Rodrigo Sáenz de Heredia, Denis Eyriey, and Antonio de la Torre.

Plot 
The plot explores the theme of incest. Upon the worsening of his grandfather's Alzheimer disease, sullen security guard Óscar meets at the hospital with lively sister María (accompanied by French boyfriend Jean) whom with he has a fraught relationship.

Cast

Production 
A Spanish-Cuban co-production, the film was produced by La Loma Blanca PC alongside 14 Pies Audiovisual and ICAIC, with the participation of Canal Sur. Shooting in the province of Almería (including locations such Cabo de Gata and El Cañarete) wrapped in March 2010.

Release 
The film screened at the 35th Toronto International Film Festival on 14 September 2010. Distributed by Golem Distribución, it was released theatrically in Spain on 18 March 2011.

Reception 
Jonathan Holland of Variety assessed that despite being "undeniably accomplished, visually striking and superbly played by Rodrigo Saenz de Heredia as its tightly-wound protag", the film "ultimately plays as too leisurely and detached for all but fest auds".

Mirito Torreiro of Fotogramas rated the film 4 out of 5 stars, praising the "extraordinary mise-en-scène", but negatively assessing the (excessive) "hieratism" displayed by the male protagonist.

Sergio F. Pinilla of Cinemanía rated the film 4 out of 5 stars, considering it to be an example of "intimate, risky and honest cinema", which were it to be authored by Louis Malle, it would be deemed a masterpiece.

Accolades 

|-
| align = "center" | 2012 || 21st Actors and Actresses Union Awards || Best New Actor || Rodrigo Sáenz de Heredia ||  || 
|}

See also 
 List of Spanish films of 2011

References 

Films shot in the province of Almería
2010s Spanish-language films
2010s Spanish films
Cuban drama films
2010 drama films
Spanish drama films
Films about siblings
Incest in film